The 2000 Cleveland Browns season was the team's 48th season with the National Football League and 52nd overall. It was the second season of the "New Browns", which returned to the NFL in 1999.

Kicker Phil Dawson was the Browns’ leading scorer with 59 points. The Browns total offense ranked 31st (last) in the league, while their total defense ranked 26th in the league. The 2000 Browns’ 161 points scored (10.06 per game) is the third-fewest ever by a team in a 16-game schedule, tied with the 1998 Eagles and behind the 1992 Seahawks and 1991 Colts. Additionally, their four games without scoring is the most in the NFL since the 1977 Buccaneers failed to score six times; by contrast the 2016 and 2017 Browns went a combined 1–31 but never failed to score a point in any game. The 1999 Browns scored 217 points, or 3.50 more per game than in 2000.

Offseason

2000 NFL draft

Personnel

Staff

Final roster

Regular season

Schedule 

Note: Intra-division opponents are in bold text.

Standings

Game summaries

Week 6: at Arizona Cardinals

Best performances 
 Tim Couch, Week 3, 316 Passing Yards vs. Pittsburgh Steelers
 Doug Pederson, Week 15, 309 Passing Yards vs. Philadelphia Eagles

Awards and records 
 Led NFL, yards punted, 4,919 yards

References

External links 
 2000 Cleveland Browns at Pro Football Reference (Profootballreference.com)
 2000 Cleveland Browns Statistics at jt-sw.com
 2000 Cleveland Browns Schedule at jt-sw.com
 2000 Cleveland Browns at DatabaseFootball.com  

Cleveland
Cleveland Browns seasons
Cleveland